Dos Cabezas ("two heads") is a painting created by American artist Jean-Michel Basquiat in 1982. The double portrait resulted from Basquiat's first formal meeting with his idol, American pop artist Andy Warhol.

History 
Basquiat first met Andy Warhol when he sold him a postcard in 1979. Later, when Basquiat was selling painted sweatshirts, he went to the Factory and Warhol purchased some. "I just wanted to meet him, he was an art hero of mine," Basquiat recalled. Bruno Bischofberger became Basquiat's art dealer and organized a one-man show in his Zurich gallery in September 1982. Bischofberger, who also represented Warhol, arranged a lunch meeting between the two artists on October 4, 1982. Warhol documented the meeting in a diary entry, which was posthumously published in The Andy Warhol Diaries (1989): Down to meet Bruno Bischofberger (cab $7.50). He brought Jean-Michel Basquiat with him. He's the kid who used the name "Samo" when he used to sit on the sidewalk in Greenwich Village and paint T-shirts, and I'd give him $10 here and there…He was just one of those kids who drove me crazy. He's black but some people say he's Puerto Rican so I don't know. And then Bruno discovered him and now he’s on Easy Street. He's got a great loft on Christie Street. He was a middle-class Brooklyn kid—I mean, he went to college and things—and he was trying to be like that, painting in the Greenwich Village. And so had lunch for them and then I took a Polaroid and he went home and within two hours a painting was back, still wet, of him and me together. And I mean, just getting to Christie Street must have taken an hour. He told me his assistant painted it.Dos Cabezas, meaning "two heads" in Spanish, is based on the self-portrait Warhol took with Basquiat. The artwork ignited a close friendship between them which led to a collaboration on numerous paintings. Warhol used a Polaroid he took of Basquiat to create the silkscreen portrait Jean-Michel Basquiat (1982) using his piss painting technique. Although Basquiat and Warhol created several portraits of each other in the following years, Dos Cabezas is their only joint portrait. It sold for $7 million at Christie's post-war and contemporary evening sale in November 2010.

Exhibitions 
Dos Cabezas has been exhibited at the following art institutions:

 Jean-Michel Basquiat at Whitney Museum of American Art in New York, October 1992–February 1993; The Menil Collection in Houston, March–May 1993; Des Moines Art Center in Iowa, May–August 1993; Montgomery Museum of Fine Arts in Alabama, November 1993–January 1994.
 Basquiat at the Brooklyn Museum in New York, March–June 2005; Museum of Contemporary Art, Los Angeles, July–October 2005; Museum of Fine Arts, Houston, November 2005–February 2006.
 Basquiat: Boom for Real at is at the Barbican in London, September 2017–January 2018.
Jean-Michel Basquiat at the Brant Foundation Study Center in the East Village, March–May 2019.

See also 

 List of paintings by Jean-Michel Basquiat

References 

Paintings by Jean-Michel Basquiat
1982 paintings
Self-portraits
Cultural depictions of Andy Warhol
Paintings of people
Black people in art